Members of the order Neogastropoda are mostly gonochoric and broadcast spawners. Life cycle: Embryos develop into planktonic trocophore larvae and later into juvenile veligers before becoming fully grown adults.

Oenopota kurilensis is a species of sea snail, a marine gastropod mollusk in the family Mangeliidae.

Description
The length of the shell varies between 9 mm and 45 mm.

Distribution
This species occurs in the Okhotsk Sea and in the Arctic Ocean.

References

 Bogdanov, IP. "7 New Species of Subfamily Oenopotinae from the Okhotsk Sea." Zoologichesky Zhurnal 68.11 (1989): 147–152.

External links
  Tucker, J.K. 2004 Catalog of recent and fossil turrids (Mollusca: Gastropoda). Zootaxa 682:1-1295.
 

kurilensis
Gastropods described in 1989